The Honda VF750F V45 Interceptor aka RC15 (Honda's internal racing code) is a sports motorcycle produced by Honda from 1983 to 1985. Using a revised engine from the Sabre/Magna with chain drive and a five-speed gearbox the half-faired motorcycle was introduced with an 86-horsepower liquid-cooled double overhead cam (DOHC) V4 four-stroke engine in a steel perimeter frame.

The bike won the Castrol Six Hour race in 1983.
The RC15 also won the AMA Superbike Championship for two years straight, 1984 and 1985 with Fred Merkel , who won also the following year 1986 aboard the RC24, Honda VFR750F, Interceptor's direct successor.

References

VF250F